Meppeler Voetbalvereniging Alcides is a football club from Meppel, Netherlands. The club, founded in 1907, is currently playing in the Eerste Klasse, the 3rd highest tier of amateur football in the Netherlands.

History 
During its first 100 years the club hovered mostly between the Tweede Klasse and Eerste Klasse. At the beginning of its second century, it hovers between the Hoofdklasse and Eerste Klasse.

References

External links
 Official site 

Association football clubs established in 1907
1907 establishments in the Netherlands
Football clubs in the Netherlands
Football clubs in Meppel